The Taman Teknologi MRT station, previously known as Technology Park is a future provisional Mass Rapid Transit (MRT) station. If constructed, it will serve the suburb of Bukit Jalil (mainly Technology Park in Kuala Lumpur, Malaysia and serve as one of the stations on Klang Valley Mass Rapid Transit (KVMRT) Sungai Buloh-Serdang-Putrajaya Line. The station will be planned to be built at the tin mine lake near Mines North toll plaza of the Besraya Expressway.

The SSP Line expected to complete and start operation on 2022.

References

External links
 Technology Park MRT Station | mrt.com.my
 Klang Valley Mass Rapid Transit website
 MRT Hawk-Eye View

Rapid transit stations in Kuala Lumpur
Sungai Buloh-Serdang-Putrajaya Line